The dark ghostshark (Hydrolagus novaezealandiae) is a shortnose chimaera of the family Chimaeridae, found on the continental shelf around the South Island of New Zealand. In June 2018 the New Zealand Department of Conservation classified the dark ghostshark as "Not Threatened" under the New Zealand Threat Classification System.

References

Finucci, B. & Kyne, P.M. 2018. Hydrolagus novaezealandiae. The IUCN Red List of Threatened Species 2018: e.T41827A116737304. https://dx.doi.org/10.2305/IUCN.UK.2018-2.RLTS.T41827A116737304.en. Accessed on 18 March 2022.

dark ghostshark
Endemic marine fish of New Zealand
Fish of the South Island
Taxa named by Henry Weed Fowler
dark ghostshark